Monogamy is the second album by Emil Bulls. It was released independently in 2000 and has been re-released in 2004 via Oh My Sweet/ALIVE.

Track listing
"Calm Down"
"Leaving You With This"
"Water"
"Chickeria"
"Mirror (Me)"
"Moonchild (Intro)"
"Hi It's Me, Christ"
"Monogamy"
"Obstacles"
"Resurrected"
"Smells Like Rock 'n' Roll"
"Wheels Of Steel"
"Quiet Night"
"DJ Sam Soe's Moonchild"

2000 albums
Emil Bulls albums